Irina Vladimirovna Kolesnikova (born 10 May 1964 in Leningrad, RSFSR, USSR) is a Russian curler and curling coach.

As a coach of Russian women's curling team she participated in 2018 Winter Olympics.

She is Master of Sport of Russia (1995) and Merited Coach of Russia (curling, 2016).

Teams

Women's

Record as a coach of national teams

References

External links

КОЛЕСНИКОВА Ирина Владимировна | Российские спортсмены и специалисты | Спортивная Россия

Living people
1964 births
Curlers from Saint Petersburg
Russian female curlers
Russian curling champions
Russian curling coaches
Honoured Coaches of Russia
Lesgaft National State University of Physical Education, Sport and Health alumni